Philip Michael is a British actor and tenor. He is best known for his roles in the feature films Mamma Mia! as Pepper and the Irish Television soap series Fair City as Joshua Udenze.

Education
Michael studied at the Italia Conti Academy of Theatre Arts. He had also done theatre work.

Career

Filmography/Television
Battle as Elson (2011 Short Film)
Control (2012 Short Film)
Ray Donovan as boxer (2012 Pilot)
Mamma Mia! as Pepper (2008 Film)
Fair City as Joshua Udenze (2005–2007 TV Series)
Crimewatch as Antagonist (BBC Series)
Londoners as Jamaj

References

External links
Official site

Alumni of the Italia Conti Academy of Theatre Arts
English male film actors
English male soap opera actors
English people of Nigerian descent
Living people
Year of birth missing (living people)